was a Japanese politician and cabinet minister in Meiji period Japan.

Early life
Hoshi was born in Edo in what is now part of Tsukiji, Tokyo; little is known about his biological father other than that he was a plasterer. His mother remarried to a medical doctor in Uraga, and he adopted the Hoshi surname. Initially intending to pursue a career in medicine, he learned English at Yokohama, and eventually became an English language instructor. After the Meiji Restoration, he enjoyed the patronage of Mutsu Munemitsu and entered into the service of the new Meiji government, serving as head of the Yokohama Customs Office. At one point he precipitated a minor diplomatic incident over a disagreement with British minister Harry Smith Parkes over what kanji to use in translating the title of “queen” as in Queen Victoria, and refusing to agree to Parkes's position, resigned his post. He then travelled to England, where he studied at the Middle Temple, and in 1877 became the first Japanese to qualify as a barrister in the United Kingdom.

On his return to Japan, Hoshi entered the Ministry of Justice, and was outspoken in his criticism of the hanbatsu, or clan-based politics, and what he perceived as the weak position of the Japanese government over the revision of the imequal treaties with the western powers. He was briefly expelled from Tokyo under the Peace Preservation Law and forbidden to publish in 1887 and jailed in 1888. Hoshi left Japan for the United States and Canada in 1888 soon after his release, remaining for a year, and continued on to England and Germany, only returning to Japan in 1890. In 1892, he was elected to the House of Representatives of Japan in the 1892 General Election under the Liberal Party and became Speaker of the House in May 1892. However, he was removed from office in December 1893 following a vote of no confidence
.  
Well versed in legal issues concerning the United States from his time as Resident Minister in Washington, D.C., from 1896 to 1898, Hoshi was scheduled to be appointed Foreign Minister under the 1st Ōkuma administration; however, due to internal political issues within the Kenseitō, the appointment never came through. Instead, Hoshi was appointed Communications Minister in the 4th Itō administration in October 1900. He also left the Kenseitō to join Itō’s Rikken Seiyūkai. However, the same month he was accused by the Mainichi Shimbun of involvement in a corruption scandal within the Tokyo City Assembly. Although he protested his innocence, he was forced to resign three months later due to a relentless campaign against his name by the newspaper. In March, he was found innocent due to lack of evidence, but during the middle of the trial he was assassinated by a middle-aged man with a short sword.

References

External links

 
Biography at National Diet Library

1850 births
1901 deaths
19th-century Japanese lawyers
Government ministers of Japan
People from Tokyo
Members of the House of Representatives (Empire of Japan)
Speakers of the House of Representatives (Japan)
Liberal Party (Japan, 1881) politicians
Kenseikai politicians
Rikken Seiyūkai politicians
Assassinated Japanese politicians
People murdered in Tokyo